Martin Damm and Jim Grabb were the defending champions, but competed this year with different partners. Damm teamed up with Max Mirnyi and lost in second round to Ellis Ferreira and Rick Leach, while Grabb teamed up with Goran Ivanišević and lost in quarterfinals also against Ferreira-Leach.

Jonas Björkman and Patrick Rafter won the title by defeating Byron Black and Wayne Ferreira 7–6(7–5), 6–4 in the final.

Seeds
The first four seeds received a bye into the second round.

Draw

Finals

Top half

Bottom half

Qualifying

Seeds

Qualifiers

Draw

First qualifier

Second qualifier

References
 Official Results Archive (ATP)
 Official Results Archive (ITF)

1999 ATP Tour
1999 du Maurier Open